Ahmad Black (born December 12, 1988) is a former American football safety who played for the Tampa Bay Buccaneers of the National Football League (NFL).  He played college football for the University of Florida, and was a member of a BCS National Championship team.  Black was drafted by the Buccaneers in the fifth round of the 2011 NFL Draft.  Black officially retired from the NFL on April 9, 2017.

Early years
Black was born in Lakeland, Florida, and he attended Lawton Chiles Middle Academy and later Lakeland High School.  As a sophomore playing for the Florida Class 5A high school football powerhouse Lakeland Dreadnaughts, he recorded 71 tackles and 10 interceptions, and 71 tackles with six interceptions as a junior.  As a Dreadnaught senior, Black recorded 82 tackles and four interceptions.

College career
Black accepted an athletic scholarship to attend the University of Florida in Gainesville, Florida, where he played for coach Urban Meyer's Florida Gators football team from 2007 to 2010.

As a freshman, Black played in seven games as a cornerback for the Gators and recorded seven tackles.  As a sophomore in 2008, Black started all 14 games at strong safety and made 59 tackles and seven interceptions for 191 return yards and two touchdowns, and was recognized as a second-team All-Southeastern Conference (SEC) selection.  Black caught his seventh interception in the Gators' 24–14 win over the Oklahoma Sooners in the 2009 BCS National Championship Game.

Following his senior season in 2010, he was a first-team All-SEC selection and received first-team All-American honors from Rivals.com and second-team honors from the Associated Press.  To end his college career, he had two interceptions, returning one 80 yards for a touchdown against Penn State in the Outback Bowl, earning Player of the Game honors.

Professional career

Black was drafted in the fifth round of the 2011 NFL Draft by the Tampa Bay Buccaneers.  He was cut on September 3, 2011, re-signed to the Buccaneers' practice squad two days later, and later activated to the active roster.  As a rookie, he appeared in four games during the 2011 regular season, with five tackles and a recovered fumble.  On October 1, 2013, he was released again by the Buccaneers, and was eligible for free agency after clearing waivers.

NFL statistics

Personal life
On November 6, 2012, the Tampa Bay Times reported that Black was cited by police for possession of less than 20 grams of marijuana.
On May 23, 2021, Black was named the defensive backs coach at Mulberry High School in Mulberry, Florida. On March 2, 2022, Black was named the defensive backs/safeties coach at Lakeland High School in Lakeland, Florida.

See also

 List of Florida Gators football All-Americans
 List of Florida Gators in the NFL Draft

References

External links 
 
 Florida Gators bio
 Tampa Bay Buccaneers bio

1988 births
Living people
American football safeties
Florida Gators football players
Lakeland High School (Lakeland, Florida) alumni
Players of American football from Florida
Sportspeople from Lakeland, Florida
Tampa Bay Buccaneers players